Ahmed Boumendjel (born in 1908 in Beni Yenni, Tizi Ouzou Province) and who died in 1982 was an Algerian politician and nationalist

Early life
He was born in 1908 in Taourirt n'Mangllat (Ain El Hammam) Grande Kabylie. He first worked as a teacher then resumed his studies, got a law degree and practiced the profession of lawyer.

He worked alongside Ferhat Abbas during the Second World War within the party Friends of the Manifesto of Liberty and then to the Democratic Union for the Algerian Manifesto.
Elected to Board of the French Union, Boumendjel had to leave Algeria to settle in France.

Algerian Revolution
He became a member of the Federation of France's National Liberation Front from 1957, then member of the National Council of the Algerian Revolution from 1957 to 1962
He then went to Tunisia where he led the newspaper El Moudjahid appearing in the French language. He is the author of the article known as "The information poisoned", which was a source of controversy between the Tunisian Government and the Provisional Government of the Algerian Republic.
It represented the Provisional Government along with Mohammed-Seddik Benyahia in Melun talks at June 1960 and participated in the first negotiations in Evian.
During the internal crisis occurred after independence, Boumendjel rallied with Ferhat Abbas to Ben Bella groupe.
He was appointed Minister of Public Works in September 1962 to 1963.

Notes

References
 Algerian Ministry of Moudjahidine (Arabic) (Dead link)

1908 births
1982 deaths
People from Beni Yenni
Democratic Union of the Algerian Manifesto politicians
National Liberation Front (Algeria) politicians
Government ministers of Algeria
Senators of French Algeria